Bank Top is a neighbourhood on the west side of Throckley, in Tyne and Wear, England.

Villages in Northumberland